Beta attenuation monitoring (BAM) is a widely used air monitoring technique employing the absorption of beta radiation by solid particles extracted from air flow. This technique allows for the detection of PM10 and PM2.5, which are monitored by most air pollution regulatory agencies. The main principle is based on a kind of Bouguer (Lambert–Beer) law: the amount by which the flow of beta radiation (electrons) is attenuated by a solid matter is exponentially dependent on its mass and not on any other feature (such as density, chemical composition or some optical or electrical properties) of this matter. So, the air is drawn from outside of the detector through an "infinite" (cycling) ribbon made from some filtering material so that the particles are collected on it. There are two sources of beta radiation placed one before and one after the region where air flow passes through the ribbon leaving particles on it; and there are also two detectors on the opposite side of the ribbon, facing the detectors. The sources' intensity and detectors' sensitivity being the same (or corrected with appropriate calibration lookup table), the intensity of beta rays detected by one of detectors is compared to that of the other. Thus one can deduce how much mass has the ribbon acquired upon being exposed to air flow; knowing the drain velocity, actual particle mass concentration in air could be assessed.

The radiation source can be a gas chamber, filled with 86Kr gas, or a pieces of 14C-rich polymer plastic, such as PMMA. Detector is simply a Geiger–Mueller counter. The particulate matter content measured is affected by the moisture content in the air, unfortunately.

To discriminate between particle of different sizes (e. g., between PM10 and PM2.5), some preliminary separation could be accomplished, for example, by cyclone battery.

A similar method exists, where instead of beta particle flow an X-ray Fluorescence Spectroscopic monitoring is applied on the either side of air flow contact with the ribbon. This allows to obtain not only cumulative measurement of particle mass, but also to detect their average chemical composition (technique works for potassium and elements heavier than it).

References

Literature 

 List of Designated Reference and Equivalent Methods. EPA: Research Triangle park, 2013. Online: http://www.epa.gov/ttn/amtic/criteria.html .

Air pollution
Aerosols
Detectors
Measuring instruments
Radioactivity
Meteorological instrumentation and equipment